2022 ACC tournament may refer to:

 2022 ACC men's basketball tournament
 2022 ACC women's basketball tournament
 2022 ACC men's soccer tournament